Trevor Anthony Brissett (2 January 1961 – 17 May 2010) was an English footballer. He played in the Football League for Port Vale and Darlington in the early 1980s. He remained involved with football for the rest of his life, playing for Stafford Rangers, Witton Albion, Macclesfield Town, and Newcastle Town, and coaching at Newcastle Town, Congleton Town, Meir KA and the Stoke City Academy.

Playing career
Brissett was contracted to Stoke City, before joining local rivals Port Vale in May 1980, after being spotted by John McGrath and John Rudge. He made 45 appearances in 1980–81, missing just five Fourth Division games. However he featured just 15 times in 1981–82, and was given a free transfer in May 1982. He spent the 1982–83 campaign with league rivals Darlington, and played 12 games before he was released by manager Billy Elliott. He moved into non-League football with Stafford Rangers and Witton Albion in 1983. He played 16 games for Witton in the 1983–84 season, featured 38 times in the 1984–85 campaign and played another 46 games in the 1985–86 season. He later played for Macclesfield Town and Newcastle Town. Whilst at Macclesfield Town in summer 1987 he was in a car crash with teammates Nigel Shaw, Ian Elsby and Steve Waddington. He managed to recover to play the final few minutes of an end of season game.

Coaching career
After a spell as Newcastle Town player/assistant manager he went on to work with Glyn Chamberlain again at Congleton Town. He also coached at Meir KA and the Stoke City Academy.

Death
Brissett died from cancer in May 2010 at the Queen Elizabeth Hospital Birmingham. His funeral was conducted on 4 June 2010, and was described as "full to capacity" with mourners. He was survived by wife Sharon and two daughters, Lauren and Morgan.

Career statistics
Source:

References

1961 births
2010 deaths
Black British sportspeople
Footballers from Stoke-on-Trent
English footballers
Association football fullbacks
Stoke City F.C. players
Port Vale F.C. players
Darlington F.C. players
Stafford Rangers F.C. players
Macclesfield Town F.C. players
Witton Albion F.C. players
Newcastle Town F.C. players
English Football League players
Northern Premier League players
Association football coaches
Deaths from cancer in England
Stoke City F.C. non-playing staff